DirkJan is a Dutch comic strip series, created in 1989 by Dutch author and artist Mark Retera. It is also the name of its main character. The series is a gag-a-day comic.

Description

DirkJan is an underachiever who stumbles through life in mostly three-panel gag-a-day comic strips. He started out in 1989 as a student at the current Radboud University Nijmegen  in the Netherlands, where he lived in a typical student house with all the stereotypical side-kicks, such as the frat boy, the beer drinker, the bossy girl who checks if everybody keeps to the house rules, and the tramps who use the heated shared hallway to stay the night. Early DirkJans contained many references to the student life of Nijmegen.

Publication

DirkJan was first published in Critic, the magazine for the local union of psychology students. It then moved on to monthly publication in the student magazine of Nijmegen (Algemeen Nijmeegs Studentenblad, ANS). DirkJan became known nationally when the then only commercial comics magazine of the Netherlands SjoSji (now defunct) started publishing the strip.

With the last move, the nature of the strip changed. Most of the student side-kicks got cancelled and DirkJan left university, first for jail (DJ is a notorious Kabouter abuser) and then to wander the globe and indeed space.

As of November 2016, there are 22 DirkJan albums, tentatively named 'DirkJan 1' through 'DirkJan 22'. Several newspapers in the Netherlands publish the comic in their daily edition.

The amateur comics magazine Iris (1990–1995) republished a number of DirkJan comics, some of which were refused for publication in SjoSji.

Sources

External links
 Portfolio of Mark Retera
 http://www.mooves.nl/ (two animated DirkJan strips, Flash-only site)

Dutch comics characters
Male characters in comics
Fictional Dutch people
Dutch comic strips
Gag-a-day comics
1989 comics debuts
Comics characters introduced in 1989
Comics set in the Netherlands